Depressaria daucivorella, the anise moth, is a moth of the family Depressariidae. It is found in France, Switzerland, Austria, Italy and on Cyprus. It has also been recorded from Israel, Turkey and Iraq.

The wingspan is about 23 mm.

The larvae feed on Laserpitium species, including Laserpitium siler and Laserpitium halleri, as well as Pimpinella anisum (anise).

References

External links
lepiforum.de

Moths described in 1889
Depressaria
Moths of Europe
Moths of Asia